Anne-Caroline Graffe (born 12 February 1986 in Papeete, Tahiti in French Polynesia) is a French taekwondo athlete.

Graffe took up taekwondo when she was 11 years old.  She left Tahiti for metropolitan France when she was 18 years old.

She won the women's heavyweight title at the 2011 World Taekwondo Championships, held in Gyeongju, South Korea, defeating South Korean An Sae-Bom 1–0 in the final.

She won the gold medal at the 2012 European Taekwondo Championships.

Graffe, who had been training under Myriam Baverel at the Institut national du sport, de l'expertise et de la performance (INSEP) for five years, had only been entered for the competition a month before the start of the 2012 Summer Olympics following the withdrawal due to injury of Gwladys Épangue. She was the first Polynesian to represent France at the Olympic Games. In her first Olympic competition, she was seeded number one. She cruised through the early rounds to reach the final, where she met Serbia's Milica Mandić. After a tight opening two rounds, Mandić opened up in the third and picked off Graffe with rapid kicks to the body and ran out a 9-7 winner.

References

External links 
 
 

Living people
1986 births
People from Papeete
French female taekwondo practitioners
Taekwondo practitioners at the 2012 Summer Olympics
Olympic taekwondo practitioners of France
Olympic silver medalists for France
Olympic medalists in taekwondo
Medalists at the 2012 Summer Olympics
Knights of the Ordre national du Mérite
Universiade medalists in taekwondo
Universiade bronze medalists for France
European Taekwondo Championships medalists
World Taekwondo Championships medalists
Medalists at the 2011 Summer Universiade